James E. Murphy (1897-1986) was a Supreme Court justice in Connecticut. Murphy served in the US Army during World War I and following it, attended Notre Dame Law School from which he graduated in 1923. Following graduation, Murphy joined Delaney, Murphy & Kotler, a law firm in Bridgeport, Connecticut. In 1941, he joined the Superior Court bench and served as a member of the state supreme court from 1957 to August 1966. He died of cancer on May 12, 1986 at the Connecticut Hospice in Branford, Connecticut.

He was succeeded on the court by Elmer W. Ryan.

References

1897 births
1986 deaths
Notre Dame Law School alumni
Justices of the Connecticut Supreme Court
People from Bridgeport, Connecticut
Deaths from cancer in Connecticut
20th-century American judges